Uummarmiutun, Uummaġmiutun or Canadian Iñupiaq is the variant of Iñupiaq (or Inuvialuktun) spoken by the Uummarmiut, part of the Inuvialuit, who live mainly in the communities of Inuvik and Aklavik in the Northwest Territories of Canada.

This dialect is essentially the same as that spoken by the Inupiat of Alaska, and is present in Canada because of migration from Alaska in the 1910s, reoccupying traditionally Siglit Inuit lands abandoned during the devastating disease outbreaks of the previous century.

Because Inuvik and Aklavik are ethnically mixed communities where English is the near-exclusive language of communication, few young people speak Uummarmiutun and the language is very endangered.

It is one of the three dialects – Kangiryuarmiutun and Siglitun are the other two – of the Inuit language grouped together under the label Inuvialuktun.

Phonology 
Uummartmiutun has thirty-one phonemes, six of which are vowels, three short and three long, five of which are diphthongs, the rest being consonants:
Vowels: 
Consonants:

Vocabulary comparison 
A comparison of some animal names in the two dialects of Iñupiatun.

The similarity in names is sometimes obscured by the different spelling conventions used in Alaska and Canada.

{| class="wikitable"
! Alaskan Iñupiaq
! Canadian Iñupiaq
! meaning
|-
|Uummaġmiutun
|Uummarmiutun
|Uummarmiut dialect
|-
|
|
|ground squirrel
|-
|
|
|tundra swan
|-
|
|
|killer whale
|-
|
|
|gray wolf
|-
|
|
|Pomarine jaeger
|-
|
|
|snow goose
|-
|
|
|reindeer{{efn|The name reindeer for semi-domesticated subspecies (Rangifer tarandus tarandus). The wild subspecies ([[Porcupine ).}}
|-
|
|
|Arctic fox
|-
|
|
|muskox
|}

See also
Eskimo–Aleut Languages
IPA

References

Further reading
 Lowe, Ronald. Uummarmiut Uqalungiha Mumikhitchirutingit = Basic Uummarmiut Eskimo Dictionary. Inuvik, N.W.T., Canada: Committee for Original Peoples Entitlement, 1984. 
 Lowe, Ronald. Basic Uummarmiut Eskimo Grammar = Uummarmiut Uqalungiha Ilihaur̂r̂utikr̂angit''. C.O.P.E, 5. Inuvik, N.W.T.: Committee for Original Peoples Entitlement, 1985. 

Agglutinative languages
Inupiat language
Indigenous languages of the North American Arctic
Inuvialuit languages